Omolyn Ophilia Davis (born 9 August 1987) is a Jamaican international football defender who last played professionally for CSHVSM of the Kazakhstani championship. She previously played for magicJack in the WPS.

She played the 2013 season for CSHVSM Kairat in Kazakhstan and became a league runner-up.

References

External links
Omolyn Davis magicJack soccer profile

2006 Lindsey Wilson statistics
2007 Lindsey Wilson statistics

1987 births
Living people
Jamaican women's footballers
Sportspeople from Kingston, Jamaica
Women's association football central defenders
MagicJack (WPS) players
Women's Premier Soccer League Elite players
George Mason Patriots women's soccer players
F.C. Indiana players
Jamaica women's international footballers
Jamaican expatriate women's footballers
Jamaican expatriate sportspeople in the United States
Expatriate women's soccer players in the United States
FC Energy Voronezh players
CSHVSM-Kairat players
Women's Professional Soccer players
Lindsey Wilson Blue Raiders women's soccer players
Western New York Flash players
Fredericksburg Lady Gunners players
USL W-League (1995–2015) players
Expatriate women's footballers in Russia
Expatriate women's footballers in Kazakhstan
Jamaican expatriate sportspeople in Kazakhstan
Jamaican expatriate sportspeople in Russia